Bayswater is a London Underground station in the Bayswater area of the City of Westminster. The station is on the Circle and District lines, between Notting Hill Gate and Paddington stations and is in Travelcard Zone 1.

Location
The station is located on the busy Queensway tourist street and is only a few metres from Bayswater Road. It is a short walk from Portobello Market. Further north along the street is the site of the former Whiteleys shopping centre, which is currently under redevelopment. Also nearby is Westbourne Grove, Queens ice rink and bowling centre, Kensington Gardens and St Sophia's Greek Orthodox Cathedral.

History
The station was opened by the steam-operated Metropolitan Railway (MR) (now the Metropolitan line) on 1 October 1868 as Bayswater, as part of the railway's southern extension to South Kensington where it connected to the District Railway (DR). Large compensation payments were made to landowners affected by the excavations and, in Leinster Gardens to the east, the frontages of two houses demolished to make way for the line were reconstructed to restore the appearance of a terrace of houses.

The platforms of Bayswater station were constructed in the trench and provided with a glazed roof. A short section of the trench was left unroofed to the west of the station to allow smoke and steam from the trains to escape from the tunnels. Even before the completion in 1884 of the continuous circuit of tracks which are now the Circle line, the MR and DR operated services through Bayswater as the Inner Circle. The MR originally provided all of the trains, but from 1871, each company operated half of the service.

In 1905, to improve the conditions in the tunnels and stations and increase service frequencies, the MR electrified the tracks through Bayswater and, in conjunction with the DR, around the whole of the Inner Circle and across most of their routes. Electric trains began running on 1 July 1905, but the MR's poor coordination of the installation work with the DR led to disruption for several months.
 
On 1 November 1926 the District line began a service between Edgware Road and Putney Bridge and the station was also renamed to Bayswater (Queen's Road) & Westbourne Grove. From this date the MR operated all Inner Circle services apart from a few District line operated Sunday services. The station was then renamed again to Bayswater (Queen's Road) in 1933. In 1946, it was renamed to Bayswater (Queensway) but the suffix was gradually dropped. In 1949, the service was separately identified on the tube map as the Circle line for the first time.

The station was refurbished by Metronet in 2006.

Services and connections

Services

Circle line
The typical off-peak service in trains per hour (tph) is:
6tph clockwise to Edgware Road via Paddington (Praed Street)
6tph anti-clockwise to Hammersmith via High Street Kensington and Victoria

District line
The typical off-peak service in trains per hour (tph) is:
6tph eastbound to Edgware Road
6tph westbound to Wimbledon

There is also a morning service every day from Acton Town (Ealing Broadway on Saturdays) to Edgware Road and a late evening service from Edgware Road to Ealing Broadway on Sundays only.

Connections
London Bus routes 7, 23, 27, 36 and 70, and night route N7 serve the station. Additionally, bus routes 23, 27 and 36 provide a 24-hour bus service.

Incidents
In November 2017, a 29-year-old man attempted to murder a 55-year-old man by pushing him in front of a District line train as it was pulling in to the platform. However, the victim survived by adopting a foetal position between the rails as the train passed over him.

In popular culture
Bayswater tube station is the subject of a painting by Walter Sickert dating from 1916, showing the platform-sign reading 'Queen's Road (Bayswater)' beside a big advertisement for Whiteley's department store. The station was later renamed Bayswater, to avoid confusion with Queensway station, which was also named 'Queen's Road' until 1946.

Whitely's had a mention in the 1964 film My Fair Lady starring Audrey Hepburn and Rex Harrison when Professor Higgins asked Col. Pickering where to go to dress a fashionable lady, "why to Whitely's of Bayswater of course".

Notes

References

Citations

Sources

External links

 London Transport Museum Photographic Archive
 

Circle line (London Underground) stations
District line stations
Tube stations in the City of Westminster
Former Metropolitan Railway stations
Railway stations in Great Britain opened in 1868
Tube station